Brión is a municipality in the province of A Coruña, in the autonomous community of Galicia in northwestern Spain. It belongs to the comarca of Santiago de Compostela and is 13 km to the east of Santiago de Compostela.

References

Municipalities in the Province of A Coruña